Henry Lawrence "Larry" Culp, Jr. (born March 1963) is an American business executive. He is chairman of General Electric and GE Healthcare. He is the first outsider to run GE in the company's 126-year history.

Prior to joining GE, Culp worked at Pall Corporation and Danaher Corporation in Washington, D.C. He joined the Danaher Corporation in 1990 and served as CEO from 2001 through 2014. Culp joined the GE board of directors in April 2018.

Early life and education
Culp was born and raised in the Washington, D.C. area, the son of a small welding company owner. He earned a bachelor's degree from Washington College, and an MBA from Harvard Business School.

Career
Culp joined Danaher in 1990 at Veeder-Root, becoming President in 1993. He was appointed a group executive and corporate officer in 1995, with responsibility for Danaher’s Environmental and Electronic Test and Measurement platforms while also being President of Fluke and Fluke Networks. He was named an Executive Vice President in 1999, Chief Operating Officer in 2001, and President as well as CEO in 2001. Previously, Culp was a senior lecturer at Harvard Business School, where he focused on leadership, strategy and general management in the MBA and executive education programs.

Culp is also a senior advisor at Bain Capital Private Equity and a non-executive director of T. Rowe Price.

Culp's pay package of up to $21 million a year for four years as chairman and CEO of General Electric has attracted attention, especially the element tied to any stock price increase, with about $47 million for a 50% rise and perhaps $300 million for a 150% increase. According to Bloomberg LP, the high base pay "sends the wrong message". In 2020, Culp was offered a contract-extension of two years by the board of General Electric that would last until August 2024. 

In April 2021, the Financial Times reported that Culp faced push back from two of the largest shareholder advisers on his pay package, which includes a bonus of $47 million. In June 2022, Culp extended his role as CEO of GE Aviation, in addition to GE.

Personal life
Culp is married, with three children, and lives in the Boston area.

References

External links
General Electric announcement

1964 births
Living people
American chief executives of Fortune 500 companies
General Electric people
Washington College alumni
Harvard Business School alumni
General Electric chief executive officers
Danaher Corporation people